James Ferguson Dowdell (November 26, 1818 – September 6, 1871) was the second President of the East Alabama College, now known as Auburn University, from 1868 to 1870, and a U.S. Representative from Alabama.

Biography
James Ferguson Dowdell was born on November 26, 1818, near Monticello, Georgia. Dowdell completed preparatory studies and in 1840 and graduated from Randolph-Macon College, Ashland, Virginia. He studied law. He was admitted to the bar in 1841 and commenced practice in Greenville, Georgia. He moved to Oak Bowery, Alabama, in 1846 and engaged in agricultural pursuits. He was an unsuccessful candidate for election to the State house of representatives in 1849 and 1851.

James Dowdell was elected as a Democrat to the Thirty-third, Thirty-fourth, and Thirty-fifth Congresses (March 4, 1853 – March 3, 1859). During the Civil War he served as colonel of the Thirty-seventh Regiment, Alabama Volunteer Infantry, under General Price from 1862 until the close of the war.

From 1868 to 1870, he served as the second President of the East Alabama College, now known as Auburn University.

References

1818 births
1871 deaths
People from Chambers County, Alabama
People from Monticello, Georgia
Confederate States Army officers
Randolph–Macon College alumni
Presidents of Auburn University
People of Alabama in the American Civil War
Auburn High School (Alabama) people
Democratic Party members of the United States House of Representatives from Alabama
People from Greenville, Georgia
19th-century American politicians